In mathematics, there are two types of Euler integral:

 The Euler integral of the first kind is the beta function 
 The Euler integral of the second kind is the gamma function 

See also
Leonhard Euler
List of topics named after Leonhard Euler

References

External links and references

 Wolfram MathWorld on the Euler Integral
 NIST Digital Library of Mathematical Functions dlmf.nist.gov/5.2.1 relation 5.2.1 and dlmf.nist.gov/5.12 relation 5.12.1

Gamma and related functions